Acacia ixodes, commonly known as motherumbung, is a shrub belonging to the genus Acacia and the subgenus Phyllodineae that is native to parts of eastern Australia.

Description
It has glabrous and resinous branchlets that are angled or flattened towards the apices. Like most species of Acacia it has phyllodes rather than true leaves. It produces yellow flowers between August and November. The simple inflorescences occur singly in the axils and have spherical to ovoid shaped flower-heads with a diameter of  containing 20 to 30 bright yellow flowers.

Taxonomy
The species was first formally described by the botanist Leslie Pedley in 1980 as part of the work  A revision of Acacia Mill. in Queensland as published in the journal Austrobaileya. It was reclassified as Racosperma ixodes by Pedley in 1987 then transferred back to genus Acacia in 2001. The only other synonym is Acacia gnidium var. latifolia. The specific epithet is a reference to the sticky nature of new shoots and immature phyllodes.

Distribution
The shrub has a wide distribution through central New South Wales extending into Queensland. In New South Wales the bulk of the population is situated between Dubbo to around Gilgandra and Mendooran

See also
 List of Acacia species

References

ixodes
Flora of New South Wales
Flora of Queensland
Plants described in 1987
Taxa named by Leslie Pedley